Shaun Patrick Norris (born 14 May 1982) is a South African professional golfer.

Professional career
Norris plays on the Sunshine Tour where he has won twice. He won the inaugural Africa Open in 2008 and the Nashua Masters in 2011. He also began playing on the European Tour in 2011 after graduating from qualifying school. He has also played on the Asian Tour and the Japan Golf Tour, where he has won five times including the Japan Golf Tour Championship Mori Building Cup Shishido Hills in 2017. He also won the Japan Open Golf Championship in 2021.

In March 2022, Norris claimed his first European Tour win at the Steyn City Championship, a co-sanctioned European and Sunshine Tour event. He shot rounds of 64 and 62 on way to beating Dean Burmester by three shots. In May, Norris claimed the Sunshine Tour Order of Merit for the 2021–22 season.

Professional wins (10)

European Tour wins (1)

1Co-sanctioned by the Sunshine Tour

Japan Golf Tour wins (6)

*Note: The 2018 Heiwa PGM Championship was shortened to 54 holes due to weather.
1Co-sanctioned by the Asian Tour
 The Japan Open Golf Championship is also a Japan major championship.

Japan Golf Tour playoff record (1–1)

Asian Tour wins (2)

*Note: The 2015 Yeangder Tournament Players Championship was shortened to 54 holes due to weather.
1Co-sanctioned by the Japan Golf Tour

Sunshine Tour wins (3)

1Co-sanctioned by the European Tour

Results in major championships
Results not in chronological order in 2020.

CUT = missed the half-way cut
"T" = tied
NT = No tournament due to COVID-19 pandemic

Results in World Golf Championships

1Cancelled due to COVID-19 pandemic

NT = No tournament
"T" = Tied

Team appearances
Amateur
Eisenhower Trophy (representing South Africa): 2002

See also
2010 European Tour Qualifying School graduates

References

External links

South African male golfers
Sunshine Tour golfers
Asian Tour golfers
Japan Golf Tour golfers
LIV Golf players
Golfers from Johannesburg
Sportspeople from Pretoria
White South African people
1982 births
Living people